The Wilkins House, at 387 S. Milledge Ave. in Athens, Georgia, was built in 1860.  It was listed on the National Register of Historic Places in 1970.

It is Classical Revival in style.  The property was owned by the University of Georgia before 1860, when it was bought by Alfred Dearing.  Dearing began construction of the house, which was not completed until after the American Civil War, and sold it in 1878.  After passing through several owners, in 1905 John Julian Wilkins and his wife purchased the house for $10,000.  Wilkens was president of the Georgia National Bank and of the American State Bank, and was "the leading banker in Athens and one of the South's most important financial figures."

The house has a "large cast iron dog guarding the grounds".

References

National Register of Historic Places in Clarke County, Georgia
Neoclassical architecture in Georgia (U.S. state)
Houses completed in 1865